The flag of Sark is white with a red St. George's cross and a red canton containing the two yellow lions (or in heraldic terms "Leopards") from the flag of Normandy. Unlike the classic White Ensigns, the lions of the flag of Sark protrude outside the canton and overflow the red cross.

It was designed by Herbert Pitt in 1938 and adopted the same year as the personal standard of the Seigneur of Sark before becoming the island's flag in 1987. The canton is similar to the arms of Normandy, of which the Channel Islands are historically a part.

The flag is flown from the Ministry of Justice in London on 6 August to mark the granting of the fief on that day in 1565. The Ministry of Justice is the British government department responsible for relations with the Crown Dependencies.

History 
Sark is a Channel Island part of the Bailiwick of Guernsey. It was originally part of the Duchy of Normandy and was owned by the monarchs of England from 1066 when Duke William of Normandy successfully invaded England and assumed the English throne. By the late Middle Ages, Sark had become a hotbed for piracy and other criminal activities. On 6 August 1565, Queen Elizabeth I appointed Hellier de Carteret as the Seigneur of Sark (known as the Dame of Sark when the holder is female) to prevent it becoming a pirate island. The office would be hereditary and the holder had to pay the English (and later British) monarch £1.79 annually for the right to rule the island as a feudal fief. As of 9 December 2008, the day before democracy was introduced to Sark, the island was the last feudal state in the Western world.

The flag of Sark was designed in 1938 when the Dame of Sark, Dame Sibyl Hathaway, approached Herbert Pitt to design a personal standard for herself. The flag was also referred to as the Seigneur's flag. The story that Dame Sibyl had told the Flag Institute that the flag had been in use for "at least two hundred years", is doubted.

The flag remained as the Seigneur's flag following the Second World War and the German occupation of the Channel Islands. In the 1960s, Dame Sibyl sold the tenement of the island of Brecqhou to Leonard Matchan. Upon taking up the tenancy, he adopted his own flag for Brecqhou using the Seigneur's flag as the basis and sewed his own personal coat of arms onto it. In 1993, when the tenement was purchased by David and Frederick Barclay, they also adopted their own flag by using the Seigneur's flag with their coat of arms defacing it.

In 1987, when Sark was invited to participate in the inaugural Island Games, it was noted the island had no individual flag to represent it. Accordingly, the Seigneur John Michael Beaumont granted permission for the Seigneur's flag to be used as the flag of Sark.

See also 
 List of flags of the United Kingdom
 Symbols of Normandy
 Flag of Guernsey

References 

National symbols of Sark
Sark
Sark
Flags displaying animals

de:Flagge Guernseys#Flaggen der Inseln